The Men's 1 km time trial (LC 3-4) at the 2008 Summer Paralympics took place on 7 September at the Laoshan Velodrome.

The world records for both LC3 and LC4 categories were broken during the event. Simon Richardson (Great Britain) set a new record of 1:14.936 for the LC3 class and Greg Ball (USA) set a new record of 1:21.157 for the LC4 class. This was the first gold medal for Great Britain at the 2008 Summer Paralympics.

PR = Paralympic Record
WR = World Record

Results

References 

Men's 1 km time trial (LC 3-4)